Aleksandr Yevgenyevich Zyablov (born 10 July 1985) is a former Russian professional football player.

Club career
He played in the Russian Football National League for FC Tambov in 2016.

External links
 
 

1985 births
People from Tambov Oblast
Sportspeople from Tambov Oblast
Living people
Russian footballers
Association football midfielders
FC Spartak Tambov players
FC Tambov players